David Proudfoot (1838 – 20 March 1891) was a New Zealand engineering contractor and company director in Dunedin. He was born in Musselburgh, or Gilmerton, Midlothian, Scotland in about 1838, or 1841.

He was a Dunedin landowner and contractor, and was one of the promoters of the Dunedin Peninsula and Ocean Beach Railway. He owned the horse-drawn trams serving the suburbs of Dunedin and having a "virtual monopoly", until he sold them to the Dunedin City and Suburban Tramway Co in 1883 for £55,000. He was the brother-in-law of newspaper proprietor Sir George Fenwick, owing to Fenwick's marriage to Proudfoot's sister Jane.

About 1883 he left Dunedin, and died in Sydney on 20 March 1891 while undergoing surgery. Reports of his age at death varied between 49 and 61. A cousin said he was 50. His Waverley Cemetery burial record and an inscription on his coffin said he was aged 49.

References

1838 births
1891 deaths
Engineers from Dunedin
Businesspeople from Dunedin
Scottish emigrants to New Zealand
People from Midlothian
19th-century New Zealand engineers

Burials at Waverley Cemetery